The Conqueror is a 1917 American silent biographical Western film directed by Raoul Walsh and starring William Farnum. It was produced and distributed by Fox Film Corporation.

Plot
This was a big budget biography film from William Fox and Raoul Walsh about Sam Houston.

Cast

Preservation
The Conqueror is now a lost film.

See also
 1937 Fox vault fire

References

External links

 
 
 Color lobby poster

1917 films
1917 Western (genre) films
1917 lost films
American biographical films
American black-and-white films
Films directed by Raoul Walsh
Fox Film films
Lost American films
Lost Western (genre) films
Silent American Western (genre) films
1910s American films
1910s English-language films